Flag Day ( or Festa e Flamurit), or Independence Day, is celebrated every 28 November as a holiday in Albania, Kosovo, North Macedonia and the Albanian diaspora. It refers to the Albanian Declaration of Independence on 28 November 1912 and the raising of the Albanian flag in Vlora by Ismail Qemali, coinciding with the day in which Skanderbeg raised the same flag in Krujë, on 28 November 1443.

See also 
 100th Anniversary of the Independence of Albania
 2017 Independence Cup (Albania)

References

Public holidays in Albania
Albania
Albania